Underneath the Stars may refer to:

Underneath the Stars (album), album by Kate Rusby
"Underneath the Stars" (song), song by Mariah Carey from Daydream